Yasmani Copello Escobar (born 15 April 1987) is a Cuban-born track and field hurdler who represents Turkey internationally. His personal best for the 400 metres hurdles is 47.81 seconds, set in the final of the 2018 European Athletics Championships in Berlin.

While representing Cuba he won a silver medal at the 2008 Central American and Caribbean Championships and was a gold medallist in the 4×400 metres relay team at the 2008 Ibero-American Championships in Athletics. He won two silver medals in the hurdles and two relay gold medals at the ALBA Games in 2007 and 2009. He moved to Turkey in 2012 and began representing his adopted country in 2014.

Career
In Cuba
He began competing at national level in Cuba as a teenager in 2006. That year he placed fourth in the 400 metres hurdles at the Cuban Athletics Championships and came fifth at the Olimpiada Cubana. He began 2007 with a series of personal bests. He improved in the 400 metres flat to record 47.48 seconds at the Rafael Fortun National Meeting and a 400 m hurdles run of 50.43 seconds in Havana. In his first international appearance he came runner-up to fellow Cuban Omar Cisneros to take silver at the 2007 ALBA Games in a new best of 49.99 seconds. He teamed up with Cisneros to help Cuba to the gold medals in the 4×400 metres relay at the event. Copello won another title with the Cuban relay team at the 2008 Ibero-American Championships in Athletics. He ran individually at the 2008 Central American and Caribbean Championships, securing the silver 400 m hurdles medal behind Jamaica's Isa Phillips as well as running in the heats of the 110 metres hurdles. He was provisionally named in the relay squad for Cuba at the 2008 Summer Olympics, but ultimately did not compete.

At the 2009 ALBA Games he repeated his finishes of two years earlier, coming second to Cisneros before sharing in a relay victory. His return at the 2009 Central American and Caribbean Championships in Athletics was less successful however, as he finished out of the medals in fifth place – the medallists, Javier Culson, Félix Sánchez and Jehue Gordon were all finalists at the 2009 World Championships in Athletics. That year brought new heights in performance, however, as in February in Havana he ran 21.44 seconds for the 200 metres, 46.77 seconds for the 400 m, and 49.56 seconds for the 400 m hurdles.

Copello competing sparingly in 2010, with highlights being a second place at Cuba's Barrientos Memorial and a win at the 2010 Olimpiada Cubana. He won the 2011 Copa Cuba meet, but that proved to be his last win in his home nation. He moved to Turkey in 2012 and began competing for Fenerbahçe Athletics, winning at the national club championships. At the 2013 Meeting Val de Reuil in France, he achieved a personal best and Cuban record of 49.54 seconds for the uncommonly held indoor 400 m hurdles. This made his indoor best faster than his outdoor one – a highly unusual feat for a 400 m hurdler.

In Turkey
He opted for Turkish nationality in October 2013, and on 30 April 2014, he became eligible to represent Turkey internationally.

Personal bests
200 metres – 21.44 seconds (2009)
400 metres – 46.77 seconds (2009)
110 metres hurdles –  14.35 seconds (2008)
400 metres hurdles (outdoor) –  47.81 seconds (2018)
400 metres hurdles (indoor) – 49.54 seconds (2013)

References

External links 
 

Living people
1987 births
Cuban male hurdlers
Cuban male sprinters
Cuban emigrants to Turkey
Cuban expatriate sportspeople in Turkey
Naturalized citizens of Turkey
Turkish male hurdlers
Turkish male sprinters
World Athletics Championships athletes for Turkey
European champions for Turkey
European Championships (multi-sport event) silver medalists
European Athletics Championships winners
Fenerbahçe athletes
Athletes (track and field) at the 2016 Summer Olympics
Olympic athletes of Turkey
Olympic bronze medalists for Turkey
Olympic bronze medalists in athletics (track and field)
Medalists at the 2016 Summer Olympics
World Athletics Championships medalists
Athletes (track and field) at the 2018 Mediterranean Games
Mediterranean Games silver medalists for Turkey
Mediterranean Games medalists in athletics
Athletes (track and field) at the 2020 Summer Olympics
Olympic male hurdlers
Mediterranean Games gold medalists for Turkey
Athletes (track and field) at the 2022 Mediterranean Games
Mediterranean Games gold medalists in athletics